Psikyo was a Japanese video game developer and publisher known for its shoot 'em ups and undressing mahjong games. It was founded in 1992 by former Video System staff who worked on the Aero Fighters series. Psikyo was mainly an arcade game developer, and ported some of their games to home consoles as well.

Psikyo was acquired by X-Nauts in 2002. In 2003, it was reported that Psikyo was shutting down. Shortly afterwards, X-Nauts stated this news was wrong. Games would continue to be released under the Psikyo label, but would be outsourced to other teams. In 2007, Psikyo programming veteran Keiyuki Haragami started a company called Zerodiv to handle distribution of Psikyo's catalog. In March 2019, Zerodiv was acquired by City Connection.

Games developed

Psikyo label games not developed by Psikyo

Notes

References

External links
Official website (Psikyo) 
Official website (X-Nauts) 
Psikyo at Arcade-History.com
PSIKYO 1ST GENERATION HARDWARE at System16 - The Arcade Museum
PSIKYO SH2 HARDWARE at System16 - The Arcade Museum
Psikyo (Company) at UVList
Hitachi SH-2 arcade hardware at UVList
Two 1997 Psikyo Developer Interviews at shmuplations.com
Psikyo's (Company) game retrospectives at HG101
X-Naut.Psikyo at MobyGames
Psikyo (Company) at Giant Bomb
Psikyo (Company) at GameFAQs

Amusement companies of Japan
Video game companies established in 1992
Video game companies disestablished in 2005
Defunct video game companies of Japan
Video game development companies
Japanese companies established in 1992
2005 disestablishments in Japan